Daniel Barrett (born 25 September 1980 in Bradford, England) is a former footballer who played in The Football League for Chesterfield.

References

English footballers
Chesterfield F.C. players
English Football League players
1980 births
Living people
Association football defenders
Stafford Rangers F.C. players
Matlock Town F.C. players